Alison Amanda Hinds (born 1 June 1970) is a British-born Bajan soca artist based in Barbados. She is one of the most popular soca singers in the world.

Biography
Alison Hinds was born in London on 1 June 1970 and grew up in Plaistow. Both of her parents were from the island of Barbados, her father a worker at Ford's Dagenham plant. When she was aged 11 her parents divorced and she migrated to Barbados with her mother. She competed in the Richard Stoute teen talent contest in 1985, finishing third. She was a lead vocalist in the popular band Square One, joining in 1987 and recording several albums with the band before leaving in 2004 after her daughter Saharan was born. Hinds won the Barbados Song Contest in 1992 with the duet with John King "Hold You in a Song", and the Road March in 1996 and 1997 and Party Monarch competition in Barbados in 1997.

Currently Alison Hinds lives with her family, her husband Edward Walcott Junior and 
her daughter, on a privately owned horse farm, which her husband manages, in Barbados. She has her own band, "The Alison Hinds Show", formed in 2005, with Hinds the main singer and most of the other members of the band young dancers and musicians. After returning to music with a vocal contribution to a remix of Kevin Lyttle's "Turn Me On", she returned to the soca scene with the hit song "Roll It Gal," which praises women's independence in lyrics about female empowerment. The song was a huge hit throughout the Caribbean, and was released in the UK in 2007 to coincide with the release of her début album. She also recorded a collaboration with Machel Montano for the remix of "Roll It Gal".

Hinds' debut solo album Soca Queen was released in October 2007. Her latest album Caribbean Queen was released in 2010 and contains collaborations with Shaggy, Richie Spice, and Jah Cure, with whom she collaborated on the single "Team Up" in 2009. She continues to tour worldwide and has performed at many of the West Indian Carnivals and festivals including Sumfest, and the West Indian American Carnival in Brooklyn.

On 11 November 2011 Alison Hinds was one of many Barbadian entertainers shown on the Where in the World is Matt Lauer? segment on NBC.

Discography

Albums

Singles

Guest appearances
"Bring It Superstar Mix" – Lalchan Babwa (Hunter) ft. Alison Hinds, Andy Singh, Bunji Garlin & Ziggy Rankin
"Ah Bottle of Rum" – Lalchan Babwa (Hunter) ft. Alison Hinds, Peter Ram
"Roll Up De Tassa Remake" – Drupatee Ramgoonai ft. Alison Hinds

See also
 List of Barbadians

References

External links 

Interview with Alison Hinds
Bajan culture and Entertainment
Hinds

1970 births
Living people
English people of Barbadian descent
Barbadian women singers
Barbadian soca musicians
Feminist musicians
21st-century women singers
British emigrants to Barbados